Tyler Lee Hoechlin (born September 11, 1987) is an American actor. Initially earning recognition for starring as Michael Sullivan Jr. in the 2002 film Road to Perdition, Hoechlin went on to star as Martin Brewer on 7th Heaven between 2003 and 2007. In television, he is also known for portraying Derek Hale on Teen Wolf and Superman in the Arrowverse series Supergirl and Superman & Lois.

Early life 
Hoechlin was born in Corona, California, on September 11, 1987, to Lori and Don Hoechlin. He has described his family's ethnic background as "Native American, German, Irish, and some others". Hoechlin has two brothers and an older sister. He graduated from Santiago High School in 2006.

Career

Baseball
Hoechlin began playing baseball at the age of seven. He played throughout high school, playing in the Area Code Games in both 2004 and 2005. He earned a scholarship to Arizona State University, where he played infield and the team made it to the College World Series in Omaha, Nebraska. In 2008, after a year at Arizona State, he transferred to the University of California, Irvine. He played infield as a second baseman for the UC Irvine Anteaters. During this time, he also played in collegiate summer leagues.

Hoechlin aimed for a career in baseball, prioritizing it over his acting commitments. This led him to turning down auditions and meetings (including with director Francis Ford Coppola) and declining the role of Emmett Cullen in the Twilight films. During Hoechlin's junior year in college, he pulled his hamstring, limiting his ability to play and practice. As a result, he participated in more acting auditions, and eventually, on the advice of his coach, made the decision to pursue acting full-time.

Acting
Hoechlin appeared in commercials as a baby. This led him to successfully audition at an acting school and obtain an agent. His first role, at the age of 11, was in Happy Haunting, a Disney Sing-Along Songs video. At the age of 13, Hoechlin was selected from 2,000 auditionees to play Michael Sullivan Jr. in Road to Perdition alongside Tom Hanks. Hoechlin was nominated for multiple awards for the role, and won both the Saturn Award for Best Performance by a Younger Actor and the Young Artist Award for Best Performance in a Feature Film – Leading Young Actor. That performance led to him getting the role of Martin Brewer in the television show 7th Heaven in 2003. Initially booked for a two-episode arc, he became a recurring character for the rest of the season.

Hoechlin was nominated for a 2004 Teen Choice Award for Breakout Male Star for the role, and remained a regular cast member for the following four years, amassing further nominations for a Teen Choice Award and a Young Artist Award. The show worked around Hoechlin's baseball schedule, filming on days he did not have practice or a game, throughout high school and his first year of college.

After 7th Heaven ended in 2007, he had small roles in other television series, including CSI: Miami, My Boys, and Castle. He also returned to film work, starring in David DeCoteau's Grizzly Rage in 2007 and appearing in Solstice the following year. He also appeared alongside Owen Wilson and Christina Applegate in the 2011 movie Hall Pass.

Hoechlin played werewolf Derek Hale in the television series Teen Wolf. He was a regular on the show for the first four seasons, and returned as a guest star for the sixth and final season in 2017. During the early seasons of the show, filmed in Atlanta, Georgia, Hoechlin lived with co-stars Tyler Posey and Dylan O'Brien. BuddyTV ranked him third on its list of "TV's 100 Sexiest Men of 2011". Throughout Teen Wolf'''s run, the cast won the Best Ensemble award at the 2013 Young Hollywood Awards and Hoechlin won the 2014 Teen Choice Award for Choice TV Male Scene Stealer.

After leaving Teen Wolf to pursue other work and film roles, Hoechlin was cast in Richard Linklater's baseball comedy Everybody Wants Some!!. To achieve a sense of camaraderie among the cast, they spent three weeks living together at Linklater's ranch while fine-tuning the script. Hoechlin was able to draw upon his baseball experience for the film, in which he played team captain McReynolds. The film was released in 2016 to critical acclaim. That same year, Hoechlin appeared in a second baseball film, Undrafted, which, in contrast to Everybody Wants Some!!, was poorly received by critics. He also appeared in military thriller film Stratton, released in 2017.

Hoechlin was cast as Superman on the CW show Supergirl in 2016. As producer Greg Berlanti's first choice for the role, he did not have to audition. Describing the casting as "surreal", Hoechlin said he hoped to successfully embody the optimism of the character and maintain the idea of Superman as a symbol of hope. He appeared in four episodes of the show's second season, and was nominated for a Saturn Award for Best Guest Performance on a Television Series for his work in the role. His portrayal of Superman was well received by fans and critics and described as "fun" and a "breath of fresh air".

In 2018, Hoechlin returned to Supergirl as part of the annual Arrowverse crossover episodes, titled "Elseworlds". He also appeared in the corresponding crossover episodes of both Arrow and The Flash, which all aired in December 2018. Hoechlin returned to the Arrowverse for the "Crisis on Infinite Earths" episodes.

In October 2019, it was confirmed that Superman & Lois, a spin-off series starring Hoechlin and Elizabeth Tulloch, was in development at the CW who picked it up straight-to-series in January 2020. The series premiered on February 23, 2021, and was renewed for a third season in March 2022.

He was cast in Fifty Shades Darker as Boyce Fox, an author, in early 2016. Hoechlin did not appear in the finished film, but did feature in the sequel Fifty Shades Freed, which was released in 2018. The same year, he appeared in The Domestics, a post-apocalytic thriller alongside Kate Bosworth and Lance Reddick, which was released on June 28.

Hoechlin starred in George Gallo's Bigger, in which he played Joe Weider. The biopic reunited Hoechlin with Teen Wolf co-star Colton Haynes, and told the story of the Weider brothers founding the International Federation of Bodybuilders. Bigger premiered on September 13, 2018, in Las Vegas, in conjunction with the Mr. Olympia competition, and was released to cinemas in October.

The following month, teen drama Then Came You premiered at the Woodstock Film Festival. Initially titled Departures when Hoechlin was cast in February 2017, the film also starred Asa Butterfield, Maisie Williams, and Nina Dobrev, and was released theatrically in February 2019.

In July 2019, Hoechlin appeared as Ian Yerxa in sci-fi drama series Another Life. Two months later, Hoechlin starred in Can You Keep a Secret? as Jack Harper, alongside Alexandra Daddario. The film is an adaptation of the novel of the same name by Sophie Kinsella and began filming in October 2018.

In May 2022, he was confirmed to reprise his role as Derek Hale for Teen Wolf: The Movie''.

Filmography

Film

Television

Video games

Awards and nominations

References

External links 

 
 
 UC Irvine player biography

1987 births
20th-century American male actors
21st-century American male actors
Male actors from California
American male child actors
American male film actors
American male television actors
American people of German descent
American people of Irish descent
Living people
People from Corona, California
Arizona State Sun Devils baseball players
UC Irvine Anteaters baseball players
Baseball players from California
American people who self-identify as being of Native American descent